Belford  may refer to:

People
Belford (name)

Places
Belford Historic District, a National Historic District in Georgetown, Texas
Belford, New Jersey, United States
Belford, New South Wales, Australia
Belford, Northumberland,  England
Belford, Ontario, Canada, a former community in Pickering,  Ontario between Whitevale, Ontario and Locust Hill, Ontario
Belford Hall, an 18th-century mansion house in Belford, Northumberland
Belford Roxo (Portuguese, "Purple Belfort"), a city in the State of Rio de Janeiro, Brazil

Other uses
Belford Hospital, locally known as The Belford, a hospital in Fort William, Scotland
Belford's melidectes (Melidectes belfordi), a bird found in Indonesia and Papua New Guinea
Belford University, an unaccredited online organization
Mount Belford, a mountain peak in the U.S. state of Colorado

See also
Belfort, a city in France 
Belfort (disambiguation)